Anastasiya Horlova is a Ukrainian canoeist. At the 2017 European championships in Plovdiv, Bulgaria, she became in pair with Mariia Kichasova European champion in K-2 200m.

She is a student of Lviv State School of Physical Culture.

References

Living people
Ukrainian female canoeists
Sportspeople from Lviv
ICF Canoe Sprint World Championships medalists in kayak
Year of birth missing (living people)
European Games competitors for Ukraine
Canoeists at the 2015 European Games
Canoeists at the 2019 European Games
21st-century Ukrainian women